Parliamentary elections were held in Hungary on 25 and 26 January 1920. However, they were only held in 164 districts. After the Treaty of Trianon was signed, the 44 districts previously occupied by Romania voted between 13 June and 5 July, whilst the 11 districts occupied by Serbia did not vote until 30 and 31 October 1921. The election was held with compulsory voting. In protest at this and other changes to the franchise that left 60% of the voting age population unable to vote, the Hungarian Social Democratic Party boycotted the elections, and called for its supporters to cast invalid votes, resulting in an unusually high number of blank or invalid votes – 12% in the January elections and over 20% in Budapest and other major cities.

The National Smallholders and Agricultural Labourers Party and the Christian National Union Party between them won 194 of the 219 seats, and formed a coalition government on 15 March. However, it lasted only until 4 June when the Treaty of Trianon was signed.

Results

Notes

References

Hungary
Hungary
Elections in Hungary
Parliamentary
Parliamentary
Hungary
Hungary